The 1954 Argentine Grand Prix was a Formula One motor race held at Autódromo 17 de Octubre in Buenos Aires, Argentina on 17 January 1954. It was race 1 of 9 in the 1954 World Championship of Drivers. Giuseppe Farina scored the pole position at an age of 47 years and 79 days, which still is a record today.

This was Juan Manuel Fangio's first home victory, following Alberto Ascari's win in 1953. He would repeat this with three consecutive victories in the following three years.

Classification

Qualifying

Race 

Notes
 – Includes 1 point for fastest lap

Championship standings after the race 
Drivers' Championship standings

Note: Only the top five positions are included. Only the best 5 results counted towards the Championship.

References

Argentine Grand Prix
Argentine Grand Prix
Argentine Grand Prix
Argentine Grand Prix